Parramatta Junior Rugby League formed in 1946, when, as a result of expanding urban sprawl an influx of residents flocked to the immediate Parramatta area, this caused a compacted competition to be formed and the Western Districts and Southern Districts competitions were revamped. In its fledgling years the competitions took in teams from far a drift as Liverpool and St Mary's and just about every town on the Cumberland plateau.

The Parramatta Junior Rugby League currently consists of 22 Clubs in the saturday competition all age groups and 7 clubs in the Sunday Parramatta district Convents RL for under 6s to under 12s only. represented by 362 teams and 6,500 players covering a vast area which consists of five Local government council areas—Hills Shire, Parramatta City, Blacktown city, Cumberland city and Fairfield city.

Parramatta Junior Rugby League

Parramatta Junior Rugby League Clubs

Central West Open Age

See also

 Balmain District Junior Rugby League
 Cronulla-Sutherland District Rugby Football League
 Manly-Warringah/North Sydney District Rugby League
 Penrith District Rugby League
 South Sydney District Junior Rugby Football League
 Sydney Roosters Juniors
 Rugby League Competitions in Australia

References

External links
 
 

Rugby league competitions in New South Wales
Rugby league in Sydney
Junior rugby league
1912 establishments in Australia
Sports leagues established in 1912
Parramatta Eels
Sport in Parramatta